Donald Ratcliffe (13 November 1934 – 19 October 2014) was an English footballer who played in the Football League for Crewe Alexandra, Darlington, Middlesbrough and Stoke City.

Career
Ratcliffe was born in Newcastle-under-Lyme and joined Stoke City in May 1953 after being recommended to the club by a local grocer who had seen him playing football in the street. He made his debut at home to Bury on Christmas Day in 1954–55 and of his 11 appearances in that season six were against Bury. He became the prankster of Stoke's dressing room and was a hugely popular figure amongst the players. On the pitch Ratcliffe's natural position was left wing although he played in every position bar centre half causing Stoke manager Tony Waddington to boast that Ratcliffe was the first £100,000 footballer – as they could have sold him for £10,000 for each position. Under Waddington he was a regular and played in every match in 1962–63 as Stoke won the Second Division title.

He fell out of favour with Waddington in the First Division and he was sold to Middlesbrough for £27,500 in September 1963. Ratcliffe's time at "Boro" was not that good as he brands manager Raich Carter as 'a waste of space' which ended with Ratcliffe joining Darlington in February 1966 helping the club gain promotion in 1965–66 which was followed by an instant relegation. He moved on again to Crewe Alexandra and again gained promotion from the Fourth Division and he ended his career with non-league Northwich Victoria. Ratcliffe died on 19 October 2014 at the age of 79.

Career statistics
Source:

Honours
 Stoke City
 Football League Second Division champions: 1962–63

 Darlington
 Football League Fourth Division runner-up: 1965–66

 Crewe Alexandra
 Football League Fourth Division 4th place promotion: 1967–68

References

External links
 

1934 births
2014 deaths
Sportspeople from Newcastle-under-Lyme
Association football wingers
English footballers
Stoke City F.C. players
Middlesbrough F.C. players
Darlington F.C. players
Crewe Alexandra F.C. players
Northwich Victoria F.C. players
English Football League players